Henry Augustus may refer to:

 Henry Augustus Buchtel (1847–1924), American public official and educator
 Henry Augustus Ellis (1861–1939), Irish Australian physician and federalist
 Henry Augustus Muhlenberg (1823–1854), American politician
 Henry Augustus Pilsbry (1862–1957), American biologist, malacologist, and carcinologist
 Henry Augustus Rawes (1826–1885), Catholic hymn writer and preacher
 Henry Augustus Rowland (1848–1901), U.S. physicist
 Henry Augustus Stephen (born circa 1943), Venezuelan singer
 Henry Augustus Ward (1834–1906), American naturalist

See also

 Augustus Henry